The General Post Office, Kolkata is the central post office of the city of Kolkata, India, and the chief post office of West Bengal. The post office handles most of the city's inbound and outbound mail and parcels. Situated in the B. B. D. Bagh area, the imposing structure of the GPO is one of the landmarks in the city.

Kolkata GPO is one of the five Philatelic Bureaus in the country (others being Mumbai GPO, Chennai GPO, Parliament Street, and New Delhi GPO) that are authorised to sell the United Nations stamps.

History

The site where the GPO is located was actually the site of the first Fort William. An alley beside the post office was the site of the guardhouse that housed the infamous 1756 Black Hole of Calcutta (1756). The General Post Office was designed in 1864 by Walter B. Grenville (1819-1874), who acted as consulting architect to the government of India from 1863 to 1868.

The staircase at the eastern side of the GPO features a brass plate, which marks the eastern end of the Old Fort William. This is probably the only remaining of the ancient fort of Calcutta. Recently a marble plaque has been installed on the Eastern walls of GPO, which highlight the Brass Plate.

To the north of the GPO is the Kolkata Collectorate, which was once the office of the regional ‘Collector’, a designation invented by the British Government after 1857 to replace the traditional Zamindars.

Building

The GPO is notable for its imposing high domed roof (rising over 220 feet) and tall Ionic-Corinthian pillars. A postal museum that was built in 1884 displays a collection of artefacts and stamps. The Philatelic Bureau is located on the southwestern end of the building.

Location
It is located on Netaji Subhas Road in B. B. D. Bagh area of Kolkata. The location is very near to BBD Bag Railway Station.

Gallery

See also
Indian Postal Service

External links

Postage stamp on GPO

Tourist attractions in Kolkata
Buildings and structures in Kolkata
K 
Government buildings in West Bengal